Robert Philip "Bob" Kaplan,  (December 27, 1936 – November 5, 2012) was a Canadian politician and lawyer.

Life and career
Born in Toronto, Ontario to Solomon and Pearl Kaplan and brother of Michael Kaplan. Kaplan attended and graduated from Forest Hill Collegiate after spending one year at Vaughan Road Collegiate Institute in Toronto and received a Bachelor of Arts in 1958 and an LL.B in 1961 from the University of Toronto. In 1963, he was called to the Ontario Bar.

He was first elected as a Liberal Member of Parliament for the Toronto riding of Don Valley in 1968, beating the Progressive Conservative candidate, Dalton Camp. He lost to the PC candidate, Jim Gillies, in the 1972 election. For the 1974 election, he switched ridings to York Centre and won by over 16,000 votes. In 1978, he failed to implement Bill C-215, which would have stripped Canadians of their citizenship if they had been convicted of war crimes.

He was re-elected in the 1979, 1980, 1984 and 1988 elections. He was the Solicitor General of Canada from 1980 to 1984 and oversaw the creation of the Canadian Security Intelligence Service and the Security Intelligence Review Committee and the termination of the Royal Canadian Mounted Police Security Service. Kaplan was also responsible for bringing in the Young Offenders Act in 1984 which established 12 as the minimum age for criminal charges, brought in shorter sentences for most offenders under the age of 18 and banned the publication of youths charged or convicted of criminal acts in most circumstances. He also pressed for and oversaw the extradition of Helmut Rauca to West Germany for war crimes.

After leaving politics in 1993, Kaplan served as the Honorary Consul of the Republic of Kazakhstan for Canada and was awarded the Order of Kazakhstan by its president in recognition of his service to the Republic. He was a director of PetroKazakhstan Inc., Platexco Inc., and Rex Diamond Mining Corp. In 2004, he joined the Board of Directors of European Goldfields, a Canadian-based resource company involved in the acquisition, exploration and development of mineral properties in Romania and the Balkans.

Kaplan died on November 5, 2012 at the age of 75 from cancer.

Archives 
There is a Robert Kaplan fonds at Library and Archives Canada.

References

External links
 

1936 births
2012 deaths
Canadian King's Counsel
Jewish Canadian politicians
Lawyers in Ontario
Liberal Party of Canada MPs
Members of the House of Commons of Canada from Ontario
Members of the King's Privy Council for Canada
Politicians from Toronto
University of Toronto alumni
Solicitors General of Canada
Members of the 22nd Canadian Ministry
Members of the 23rd Canadian Ministry